
Gmina Pawłowiczki is a rural gmina (administrative district) in Kędzierzyn-Koźle County, Opole Voivodeship, in southwestern Poland. Until 1945, Pawlowiczki was seat of the Moravian Brethren's Congregation Gnadenfeld (Gracefield) and from 1818 to 1922 seat of their theological seminary.

Villages
Gmina Pawłowiczki contains the villages and settlements of Borzysławice, Chrósty, Dobieszów, Dobrosławice, Gościęcin, Grodzisko, Grudynia Mała, Grudynia Wielka, Jakubowice, Karchów, Kózki, Ligota Wielka, Maciowakrze, Mierzęcin, Milice, Naczęsławice, Ostrożnica, Pawłowiczki, Przedborowice, Radoszowy, Trawniki, Ucieszków and Urbanowice.

Neighbouring gminas
Gmina Pawłowiczki is bordered by the gminas of Baborów, Głogówek and Głubczyce.

Gallery

References

Pawlowiczki
Kędzierzyn-Koźle County